Depressaria is a moth genus of the superfamily Gelechioidea. It is the type genus of subfamily Depressariinae, which is often – particularly in older treatments – considered a distinct family Depressariidae or included in the Elachistidae, but actually seems to belong in the Oecophoridae.

The genus' type species is the parsnip moth. Its scientific name has been much confused for about 200 years. Adrian Hardy Haworth, on establishing the genus Depressaria in his 1811 issues of Lepidoptera Britannica, called the eventual type species Phalaena heraclei, an unjustified emendation of P. (Tortrix) heracliana. In this he followed such entomologists of his time as Anders Jahan Retzius, who in 1783 had believed the parsnip moth to be a species originally described by Carl Linnaeus in 1758. But in fact, this was a misidentification; Linnaeus' moth was actually the one known today as Agonopterix heracliana. To make matters worse, John Curtis popularized another incorrect spelling, D. heracleana, apparently first introduced (as Pyralis heracleana) by Johan Christian Fabricius in his 1775 Systema Entomologiae.

Species
New species of Depressaria continue to be discovered and described. Known species include:

 Depressaria absynthiella Herrich-Schäffer, 1865
 Depressaria adustatella Turati, 1927
 Depressaria albipunctella (Denis & Schiffermüller, 1775) (= D. aegopodiella, D. albipuncta)
 Depressaria alienella Busck, 1904 (= D. corystopa, D. nymphidia)
 Depressaria altaica Zeller, 1854
 Depressaria angelicivora Clarke, 1952
 Depressaria angustati Clarke, 1941
 Depressaria armata Clarke, 1952
 Depressaria artemisiae Nickerl, 1864 (= D. dracunculi)
 Depressaria artemisiella McDunnough, 1927
 Depressaria assalella Chrétien, 1915
 Depressaria atrostrigella Clarke, 1941
 Depressaria basicostata Matsumura, 1931
 Depressaria badiella (Hübner, 1796)
 Depressaria beckmanni Heinemann, 1870
 Depressaria besma Clarke, 1947
 Depressaria betina Clarke, 1947
 Depressaria bupleurella Heinemann, 1870
 Depressaria cervicella Herrich-Schäffer, 1854
 Depressaria chaerophylli Zeller, 1839
 Depressaria chlorothorax Meyrick, 1921
 Depressaria cinderella Corley, 2002
 Depressaria cinereocostella Clemens, 1864 (= D. clausella)
 Depressaria clausulata Meyrick, 1911
 Depressaria colossella Caradja, 1920
 Depressaria compactella Caradja, 1920
 Depressaria constancei Clarke, 1947
 Depressaria corticinella Zeller, 1854
 Depressaria danilevskyi Lvovsky, 1981
 Depressaria daucella (Denis & Schiffermüller, 1775) (= D. apiella, D. nervosa (sensu auct. non Haworth, 1811: misidentified), D. rubricella)
 Depressaria daucivorella Ragonot, 1889
 Depressaria depressana – purple carrot-seed moth
 Depressaria despoliatella Erschoff, 1874
 Depressaria deverrella Chrétien, 1915
 Depressaria discipunctella Herrich-Schäffer, 1854
 Depressaria djakonovi Lvovsky, 1981
 Depressaria douglasella Stainton, 1849
 Depressaria eleanorae Clarke, 1941
 Depressaria emeritella Stainton, 1849
 Depressaria erinaceella Staudinger, 1870
 Depressaria eryngiella Millière, 1881
 Depressaria erzurumella Lvovsky, 1996
 Depressaria filipjevi Lvovsky, 1981
 Depressaria floridella Mann, 1864
 Depressaria fuscipedella Chrétien, 1915
 Depressaria fusconigerella Hanneman, 1990
 Depressaria fuscovirgatella Hannemann, 1967
 Depressaria gallicella Chrétien, 1908
 Depressaria genistella Walsingham, 1903
 Depressaria halophilella Chrétien, 1908
 Depressaria hannemanniana Lvovsky, 1990
 Depressaria heydenii Zeller, 1854
 Depressaria hofmanni Stainton, 1861
 Depressaria hirtipalpis Zeller, 1854
 Depressaria illepida Hannemann, 1958
 Depressaria incognitella Hannemann, 1990
 Depressaria indecorella Rebel, 1917
 Depressaria indelibatella Hannemann, 1971
 Depressaria irregularis Matsumura, 1931
 Depressaria ivinskisi Lvovsky, 1990
 Depressaria jugurthella (Lucas, 1849)
 Depressaria juliella Busck, 1908
 Depressaria kailai Lvovsky, 2009
 Depressaria karmeliella Amsel, 1935
 Depressaria kasyi Hannemann, 1976
 Depressaria krasnowodskella Hannemann, 1953
 Depressaria kondarella Lvovsky, 1981
 Depressaria lacticapitella Klimesch, 1942
 Depressaria latisquamella Chrétien, 1922
 Depressaria leptotaeniae Clarke, 1933
 Depressaria leucocephala Snellen, 1884
 Depressaria libanotidella Schläger, 1849
 Depressaria longipennella Lvovsky, 1981
 Depressaria macrotrichella Rebel, 1917
 Depressaria manglisiella Lvovsky, 1981
 Depressaria marcella Rebel, 1901
 Depressaria millefoliella Chrétien, 1908
 Depressaria moranella Chrétien, 1907
 Depressaria moya Clarke, 1947
 Depressaria multifidae Clarke, 1933
 Depressaria nemolella Svensson, 1982
 Depressaria niphosyrphas Meyrick, 1931
 Depressaria nomia Butler, 1879
 Depressaria olerella Zeller, 1854
 Depressaria orthobathra Meyrick, 1918
 Depressaria palousella Clarke, 1941
 Depressaria peniculatella Turati, 1922
 Depressaria panurga Meyrick, 1920
 Depressaria parahofmanni Hannemann, 1958
 Depressaria pentheri Rebel, 1904
 Depressaria peregrinella Hannemann, 1967
 Depressaria petronoma Meyrick, 1934
 Depressaria pimpinellae Zeller, 1839
 Depressaria platytaeniella Hannemann, 1977
 Depressaria prospicua Meyrick, 1914
 Depressaria pteryxiphaga Clarke, 1952
 Depressaria pulcherrimella Stainton, 1849
 Depressaria pyrenaella Sumpich, 2013
 Depressaria radiella (Goeze, 1783) – parsnip moth (= D. heracleana, D. heraclei, D. heracliana (sensu auct. non (Linnaeus, 1758): misidentified), D. ontariella, D. pastinacella)
 Depressaria radiosquamella Walsingham, 1898
 Depressaria rhodoscelis Meyrick, 1920
 Depressaria rjabovi Lvovsky, 1990
 Depressaria rubripalpella Chrétien, 1922
 Depressaria ruticola Christoph, 1873
 Depressaria schaidurovi Lvovsky, 1981
 Depressaria schellbachi Clarke, 1947
 Depressaria sibirella Lvovsky, 1981
 Depressaria silesiaca Heinemann, 1870
 Depressaria sordidatella Tengström, 1848 (= D. weirella)
 Depressaria spectrocentra Meyrick, 1935
 Depressaria subalbipunctella Lvovsky, 1981
 Depressaria subhirtipalpis Hannemann, 1958
 Depressaria subnervosa Oberthür, 1888
 Depressaria tenebricosa Zeller, 1854
 Depressaria togata Walsingham, 1889 (= D. thustra)
 Depressaria ultimella Stainton, 1849
 Depressaria ululana Rössler, 1866
 Depressaria varzobella Lvovsky, 1982
 Depressaria velox Staudinger, 1859
 Depressaria veneficella Zeller, 1847
 Depressaria venustella Hannemann, 1990
 Depressaria whitmani Clarke, 1941
 Depressaria yakimae Clarke, 1941
 Depressaria zelleri Staudinger, 1879

Some other Oecophoridae were formerly included here, among them close relatives of the present genus (e.g. Psorosticha zizyphi and many species of Agonopterix), as well as more distantly related taxa (e.g. Ironopolia sobriella). Horridopalpus is sometimes still included in Depressaria as a subgenus (namely by sources that uprank Depressariinae to full family status), but may be a far more distant relative. The members of the proposed subgenus Hasenfussia are tentatively retained here on the other hand, but their relationship to other Depressaria requires further study.

Unknown and undescribed species
 Depressaria albiocellata Staudinger, 1871, described from Greece
 Depressaria aurantiella Tutt, 1893, described from Great Britain
 Depressaria kollari Zeller, 1854, described from Australia
 Depressaria pavoniella (Amary, 1840) (Oecophora), described from France
 Depressaria reticulatella Bruand, 1851, described from France
 Depressaria sp. A 'Wyoming-California'
 Depressaria sp. B 'Modoc County, California'

Former species
 Depressaria tabghaella Amsel, 1935

Footnotes

References
  (2009): Depressaria. Version 2.1, 2009-DEC-22. Retrieved 24 February 2010.
  (2004): Butterflies and Moths of the World, Generic Names and their Type-species – Depressaria. Version of 5 November 2004. Retrieved 24 April 2010.
  (2009): Markku Savela's Lepidoptera and Some Other Life Forms – Depressaria. Version of 29 December 2003. Retrieved 24 April 2010.
 , 1904. Tineid moths from British Columbia, with descriptions of new species. Proceedings of the United States National Museum. 27: 745–778.
 , 1983: Neue Synonyme bei den Depressarien (Lep. Oecophoridae). Deutsche Entomologische Zeitschrift 30 (4-5): 373–376. Abstract: .
 , 1990: Neue Depressarien (Lepidoptera: Oecophoridae). Deutsche Entomologische Zeitschrift 37 (1-3): 137–144. Abstract: .
 , 2009: A new species of the genus Depressaria Haworth, 1811 (Lepidoptera: Depressariidae) from Kazakhstan and Tajikistan. Zoosystematica Rossica 18 (1): 70–72.
 , 2001: A review of Flat Moths of the genus Depressaria Haworth, 1811 (Lepidoptera: Depressariidae) of the fauna of Russia and neighboring Countries: 1. Entomological Review 81 (5): 520–541.
 , 2013: Depressaria pyrenaella sp..n. – a confused species from South-Western Europe (Lepidoptera: Depressariidae). The Entomologist's Record and Journel of Variation 125 (3): 114–118.

 
Depressariinae
Taxa named by Adrian Hardy Haworth